Simran Kaur Jhamat (born 22 January 2001) is an English professional footballer who plays as a midfielder in the FA Women's Championship for Coventry United.

Early life
Jhamat grew up in a Punjabi Sikh family in Walsall. She started her football career with Sporting Khalsa, before joining Aston Villa at youth level.

Club career
Jhamat started her professional career with Liverpool of the FA Women's Super League. Jhamat made her professional debut on 6 January 2019 in a 2–0 defeat against Brighton.

Jhamat moved to Leicester City in March 2019, making 3 appearances before the end of the 2018–19 season.

In January 2020, Jhamat moved to Coventry United. She made her debut for the club starting in a fourth round FA Cup victory over Southampton. She made two league and two cup appearances for the club before leaving at the end of the season.

On 17 August 2022, Coventry United Women announced that Jhamat had re-signed for the club.

International career
Jhamat has represented England at U17, U18 and U19 level.

Career statistics
.

References

External links

Living people
Women's association football forwards
2001 births
English women's footballers
Women's Super League players
Liverpool F.C. Women players
Leicester City W.F.C. players
Coventry United W.F.C. players
Bristol City F.C. players
British Sikhs
British Asian footballers
English people of Punjabi descent
British sportspeople of Indian descent
Women's Championship (England) players
England women's youth international footballers